António Luís Gomes (23 September 1863 in Porto – 28 August 1961) was a Portuguese jurist and Portuguese Republican Party politician. He married Maria José Medeiros de Oliveira, and was father of the mathematician Ruy Luís Gomes.

As a student at the University of Coimbra he was the main mover in the founding of the Associação Académica de Coimbra.

Later during the Portuguese First Republic he was a government minister and ambassador to Brazil.

References

1863 births
1961 deaths
Portuguese jurists
Portuguese Republican Party politicians
University of Coimbra alumni
People from Porto
Government ministers of Portugal
Ambassadors of Portugal to Brazil
20th-century jurists
20th-century Portuguese politicians
20th-century diplomats